Kim Genelle (born September 13, 1956) is an American fashion model and actress. She was born in Los Angeles, California, United States, as Kim Genelle Wilkins.

Genelle was primarily a fashion model during the 1970s and 1980s. She made her acting debut in the television series, Hart to Hart, as a hostess in 1979. On the movie screens, she best known for her roles in Planes, Trains & Automobiles (1987), Nothing in Common (1986) and Hollywood Shuffle (1987). From 1988, commercials & precision driving have been her focus. However, in 2013 she returned to acting, with an appearance on Criminal Minds.

Filmography
Hart to Hart 1979 (uncredited)
Scruples (miniseries) 1980
Nothing in Common 1986
Hollywood Shuffle 1987
Planes, Trains and Automobiles 1987 (as Kim Genell)
Under the Gun (1988 film) 
Criminal Minds 2013

References

1956 births
People from Los Angeles
Living people
Models from Los Angeles
American actresses
Female models from California
21st-century American women